Arjun Babuta (Hindi: अर्जुन बाबूता) is an Indian sport shooter. He is from Chandigarh who competes in the 10 meter air rifle events. Arjun has been a part of the Indian Shooting Team since 2016. He has represented India at the ISSF Junior World Cup 2016(Suhl), ISSF Junior World Cup 2016(Gabala), ISSF Junior World Championship 2017(Suhl) and the ISSF Junior World Cup 2018(Sydney).

Career
Arjun Babuta won one bronze in ISSF Junior World Cup 2018(Sydney).
He won one gold medal and one bronze medal in 10m Air Rifle Event at ISSF Junior World Cup 2016, Gabala.

He won the silver in the at 10th Asian Airgun Championship, Wako City in Japan.

He also won the silver in the 27th Meeting of Shooting Hopes 2017 international junior competition, Plzen, Czech Republic.

References

External links
 Profile at ISSF

Living people
1999 births
Indian male sport shooters
ISSF rifle shooters
Sport shooters from Punjab, India